Omorgus pampeanus is a species of hide beetle in the subfamily Omorginae.

References

pampeanus
Beetles described in 1876